Merrick Square is a garden square in Newington, London. The square is named after Christopher Merrick, a London merchant who in 1661 left land to Trinity House Corporation. The Corporation subsequently developed housing on the land, grouped around a series of squares of which Merrick Square is one. 

There are 32 houses that were built from 1853 to 1872, and they overlook a private garden in the centre, which is still enclosed by its original 19th-century cast-iron railings. 

The rectory of Holy Trinity church sits between 16 and 17 Merrick Square on the south-west side.

In 1861, the cricketer Alfred Mynn died at his brother's house at 22 Merrick Square.

References

Squares in the London Borough of Southwark
1853 establishments in England
Garden squares in London